Zalophia funebris is a species of beetle in the family Cerambycidae, the only species in the genus Zalophia.

References

Trachyderini
Monotypic beetle genera